Kangaroo River, a watercourse of the Clarence River catchment, is located in the Northern Tablelands district of New South Wales, Australia.

Course and features
Kangaroo River rises on the slopes of the Great Dividing Range, near Moleton, southwest of Glenreagh, and flows generally north by west and then north by east, joined by the Towallum River before forming its confluence with the Orara River, southeast of Coutts Crossing. The river descends  over its  course; and flows through the Nymboida National Park in its upper reaches.

See also

 Rivers of New South Wales

References

 

Rivers of New South Wales
Northern Tablelands